The Tower of Fautea is a Genoese tower located in the commune of Zonza (Corse-du-Sud) on the east coast of the French island of Corsica.

The tower was one of a series of coastal defences constructed by the Republic of Genoa between 1530 and 1620 to stem the attacks by Barbary pirates. It was built before 1601, the date of a document recording a payment made to one of the soldiers responsible for guarding the tower. It was attacked and burnt in 1650 by the Ottoman Turks. It was restored between 1988 and 1991 and again between 1994 and 1995.  In 1992 it was listed as one of the official historical monuments of France.

The tower is owned and maintained by the Collectivité Territoriale de Corse in an agreement with the French government agency, the Conservatoire du littoral. The agency plans to purchase  of the headland and as of 2011 had acquired .

See also
List of Genoese towers in Corsica

References

External links
 Includes information on how to reach 90 towers and many photographs.

Towers in Corsica
Monuments historiques of Corsica